Adam Gdacius or Gdacjusz or Gdak, also called Rey of Silesia (1615–1688) was a Polish-language writer and a Lutheran pastor at the Wilna church 

He was born and died in the Silesian town of Kreuzburg (now Kluczbork), where from 1644 was a deacon and, later, a parish priest. He wrote sermons and moralizing literature in Polish and Latin, mainly in the years 1674–1687.

Published works
 Kwestyja o pojedynkach
 O pańskim i szlacheckim stanie albo rycerskim dyszkurs
 Dyszkurs o pijaństwie
 Kwestyja o polygamijej albo wielożeństwie
 Trojaki o ołtarzach, obrazach i organach dyszkurs
 Kwestyja o zmartwychwstaniu
 Kwestyjej o Pannie Maryjej
 Dyszkurs o dobrych uczynkach

References

Sources
 http://olesnica.nienaltowski.net/GdacjuszAdam.htm — about Adam Gdacius (in Polish)

1615 births
1688 deaths
Polish Lutheran clergy
People from Kluczbork
People from Austrian Silesia